White Witch, or Jadis, is a fictional character in The Chronicles of Narnia series.

White Witch may also refer to:

 White witch, a practitioner of folk magic for benevolent purposes

Music
 White Witch (band), a 1970s American hard rock band
 White Witch (album), by Andrea True Connection, 1977
 "White Witch", a song by Savatage from the 1987 album Hall of the Mountain King

Other uses
 White Witch (comics), a fictional character in DC Comics 
 White Witch (Amalgam Comics) a fictional character 
 White witch moth, Thysania agrippina, a species in the family Erebidae
 "White Witch" a 1985 episode of Star Wars: Droids
 White Witch of Rose Hall, a legendary story of a haunting in Jamaica
 The White Witch, a 1958 novel by Elizabeth Goudge
 "The White Witch", the 1985 premiere episode of Star Wars: Droids

See also
 
 Witch (disambiguation)
 Good witch (disambiguation)
 White Lady (disambiguation)
 White wizard (disambiguation)
 Stevie Nicks, who played a white witch version of herself in American Horror Story